David Kajínek (born July 10, 1988) is a Czech professional ice hockey defenceman who currently plays for HC Dukla Jihlava in the Czech 1.liga. He previously played for Bílí Tygři Liberec in the Czech Extraliga.

References

External links

1988 births
Czech ice hockey defencemen
HC Benátky nad Jizerou players
HC Bílí Tygři Liberec players
HC Dukla Jihlava players
Living people
HK Dukla Trenčín players
People from Frýdlant
Sportspeople from the Liberec Region
Czech expatriate ice hockey players in Slovakia